Delly Madrid (born April 29, 1979) is a Peruvian reality television contestant, model, and dancer.  She became a model in Punta del Este.

In 2008, she won fourth place in the second season of the Peruvian version of Bailando por un Sueño and won the spin-off, Reyes del.  Her prizes were 200,000 dollars and a participation in the Second Dance World Championship.

References

External links 
Delly Madrid se limpió ante rumores: aclaró que no le quitó el novio a nadie (ElComercio) 
Delly Madrid y José Luis son los Reyes de la pista 

Peruvian female models
1979 births
Living people
Peruvian female dancers